Ian William Sharps (born 23 October 1980) is an English former footballer who is currently First-Team Coach at Walsall Football Club. During his playing career he was a defender most commonly deployed at centre-back.

Career
Born in Warrington, Sharps is a tall central defender who signed for Tranmere Rovers after serving as a trainee and soon established himself as a first team regular making almost 200 appearances. Sharps joined Rotherham United on a two-year deal during the summer of 2006. Following the 2007–08 season, he signed a new two-year contract with Rotherham. Sharps played his 100th game for the Millers in their FA Cup tie away at Aldershot Town. Despite going through three points deductions, Ian has remained loyal to The Millers and has established himself as one of Rotherham's most consistent performers. Sharps got voted Rotherham United Player of the Year in 2009, resulting him being re-appointed club captain for the 2009 season. On 14 June 2010, Sharps signed for Shrewsbury Town, and was named as club captain. Over a time period of 2 seasons, he helped guide Shrewsbury to promotion from League Two in the 2011–12 season. However, despite the accolade, he was to move on, and return to his former club.

Sharps re-joined Rotherham United on 22 May 2012, with Sharps opting for the Millers and the lure of the New York Stadium, where he was appointed the captain.

On 18 January 2013, Sharps was loaned out to Burton Albion, before joining them permanently at the end of the season. Although he was a regular player for Burton at first, he fell out of favour after the departure of manager Gary Rowett to Birmingham City, and Sharps joined AFC Telford United on loan in February 2015 for the rest of the season. At the end of the season, it was announced that he would be leaving Burton at the end of his contract, and signing permanently for Telford United on a one-year deal at that point.

Managerial statistics

Honours
Individual
PFA Team of the Year: 2009–10 League Two, 2010–11 League Two, 2011–12 League Two

References

External links

1980 births
Living people
Footballers from Warrington
English footballers
Association football defenders
Tranmere Rovers F.C. players
Rotherham United F.C. players
Shrewsbury Town F.C. players
Burton Albion F.C. players
AFC Telford United players
Chester F.C. players
English Football League players
National League (English football) players
Chester F.C. non-playing staff
Walsall F.C. non-playing staff